This page presents the results of the men's and women's volleyball tournament during the 1991 Pan American Games, which was held from August 11 to August 18, 1991, in Havana, Cuba.

Men's indoor tournament

Preliminary round robin

Sunday August 11

Monday August 12

Tuesday August 13

Wednesday August 14

Thursday August 15

Final round

Saturday August 17
Fifth place match

Semi-finals

Sunday August 18
Bronze medal match

Gold medal match

Final ranking

Individual awards

Women's indoor tournament

Preliminary round robin

Final round

Saturday August 17
Fifth place match

Semi-finals

Sunday August 18
Bronze medal match

Gold medal match

Final ranking

Individual awards

References
 Men's results
 Women's results

Events at the 1991 Pan American Games
1991
Pan American Games
International volleyball competitions hosted by Cuba